Prime mover may refer to:

Philosophy
Unmoved mover, a concept in Aristotle's writings

Engineering
 Prime mover (engine), motor, a machine that converts various other forms of energy (chemical, electrical, fluid pressure/flow, etc) into energy of movement
 Prime mover (locomotive), one of the several types of power plants used in locomotives to provide traction power
 Prime mover (tractor unit), a heavy-duty towing engine that provides motive power for hauling a towed or trailered load

Anatomy
 Prime mover, another name for an agonist muscle

Entertainment
 Prime Mover (film), a 2009 Australian romantic crime film
 Prime Mover (comics), a fictional character in the Marvel Universe
 Prime Mover, a video game published by Psygnosis in 1993
 "The Prime Mover", a 1961 episode of The Twilight Zone
 The Prime Movers, a quasi-omniscient race of alien superbeings in the Buck Godot comic series by Phil Foglio

Music
  Prime Mover (album), a 1988 album by the Christian Rock band AD
 The Prime Movers (Michigan band), a 1960s band featuring a pre-Stooges Iggy Pop
 The Prime Movers (Los Angeles band), a predecessor band of Dread Zeppelin
 Prime Movers (Slim Dusty album), a 2016 compilation by Slim Dusty
 "Prime Mover", a 1983 single by Leather Nun 
 "Prime Mover", a 1987 single by Zodiac Mindwarp
 "Prime Mover", a song on Rush's 1987 album Hold Your Fire
 "Prime Mover", a song on Ghost's 2010 album Opus Eponymous
 "Prime Mover", a 2012 album by German trance producer Alex M.O.R.P.H.
 "Prime Movers", a song on Covenant's 2013 album Leaving Babylon
 The Prime Movers, a band of former members of The Prisoners

See also
 First mover (disambiguation)